Fulford is an unincorporated community and a census-designated place (CDP) located in and governed by Eagle County, Colorado, United States. The CDP is a part of the Edwards, CO Micropolitan Statistical Area. The population of the Fulford CDP was 2 at the United States Census 2010. The Edwards post office (Zip Code 81632) serves the area.

History
Fulford is named for Arthur H. Fulford, an early settler.

Geography

Demographics

See also

Outline of Colorado
Index of Colorado-related articles
State of Colorado
Colorado cities and towns
Colorado census designated places
Colorado counties
Eagle County, Colorado
Colorado metropolitan areas
Edwards, CO Micropolitan Statistical Area
White River National Forest

References

External links

Fulford @ GhostTowns.com
Fulford, Colorado Mining Claims And Mines
Fulford Loop in White River National Forest

Census-designated places in Eagle County, Colorado
Census-designated places in Colorado